The Executive Office of Health and Human Services is a cabinet-level agency in Rhode Island. The current EOHHS Secretary is Womazetta Jones.

EOHHS was created by the Rhode Island General Assembly in 2006 and is codified in Title 42 Chapter 7.2 of the R.I. General Laws. The agency serves as an umbrella organization for Rhode Island's healthcare and social services agencies.

Secretaries

See also

 Health department
 List of Rhode Island state agencies

References

External links
Rhode Island Executive Office of Health and Human Services

State agencies of Rhode Island
State departments of health of the United States
Medical and health organizations based in Rhode Island